The 1984 South West Surrey by-election was a parliamentary by-election held on 3 May 1984 for the British House of Commons constituency of South West Surrey.

Previous MP 
The seat had become vacant on 10 March 1984. The constituency's Conservative Member of Parliament (MP), Maurice Macmillan, had died suddenly at the age of 63. He had recently acquired the courtesy title of Viscount Macmillan of Ovendon when his father (who would ultimately outlive him by nearly three years) was created the Earl of Stockton on 24 February 1984.

Maurice Macmillan was a Cabinet minister in Edward Heath's government in the 1970s, as well as the son of former Conservative Prime Minister Harold Macmillan, who was still alive when his son died. He had been South West Surrey's MP since the constituency was created for the 1983 general election, having previously been MP for Farnham from 1966.  Macmillan had first entered Parliament at the 1955 general election representing the constituency of Halifax, but had lost his seat at the 1964 general election.

Candidates 
Six candidates were nominated. They are listed below in descending order of votes.

1. Mrs Virginia Hilda Brunette Maxwell Bottomley (born 1948), was the Conservative candidate. She was a part-time psychiatric social worker, at the time of the by-election. She is married to Peter Bottomley who has also served as a Conservative MP.

Mrs Bottomley had contested the Isle of Wight in the 1983 general election. Subsequent to the by-election she retained the seat, until she retired from the House of Commons and was granted a Life Peerage in 2005. She served as a member of John Major's cabinet from 1992 until 1997.

2. The Liberal Party candidate, representing the SDP-Liberal Alliance, was freelance journalist and broadcaster Gavin Douglas Scott (born 1950). Since the by-election Scott has become known as a screenwriter.

3. The Labour nominee was Mrs Barbara Maureen Roche (born 1954), a barrister. Mrs Roche has subsequently been elected to Parliament and has served as a junior minister.

4. Victor Litvin was an Independent candidate, who upset some people with his unique ballot paper label.

5. Miss Helen Mary Anscomb was an Independent candidate, who frequently contested by-elections in the 1980s.

6. Peter Reid Smith, was another Independent candidate.

Votes

See also
 South West Surrey constituency
 Surrey
 List of United Kingdom by-elections
 United Kingdom by-election records

Notes

References
 Britain Votes/Europe Votes By-Election Supplement 1983-, compiled and edited by F.W.S. Craig (Parliamentary Research Services 1985)
British Parliamentary by-elections: Surrey South West, 1984
 

1984 elections in the United Kingdom
1984 in England
By-elections to the Parliament of the United Kingdom in Surrey constituencies
1980s in Surrey
May 1984 events in the United Kingdom